The Evangelical Reformed Church of Myanmar is a Reformed, Christian Church in the country of Myanmar (formerly Burma). It holds to the Westminster Confession of Faith

History 
The church was formally organised in 1998. It was established by Rev. Dr. Thang Bwee. Main activities and church planting is located in the Southern part of Chin State. For many years the church struggled without help. In the early 2000s, the denomination suffered a split because some pastors questioned the Reformed doctrine of church government, preferring one-man leadership over their churches. About one-third of the congregations withdrew, mostly to Pentecostal Churches. In 2003, a mission partnership was made with the Presbyterian Church of Australia, and shortly after organisation, the denomination grew to 1,800 members; by 2000 the church grew to 2,500 followers; and by 2008, the denomination had about 7,000 members and 40 churches. Presently, there are 36 ministers working both in Chin State and in Yangon Division, with Presbyterian church government.

The church celebrated its 20th anniversary on October 22, 2012.

Theology

Creeds 
 Apostles Creed

Confessions 
 Westminster Confession of Faith
 Westminster Larger Catechism
 Westminster Shorter Catechism

Relationship with other churches 
The denomination is a member of the World Reformed Fellowship. Partner church relationship with the Presbyterian Church in Australia was established in 2003. The Evangelical Reformed Church is involved in church planting; they have planted 3 congregations around the wider Yangon area including Tarmwe, Htauk Kyant, and Tada townships. The ERC also has a relationship with the Reformed Church in America.

Education and Seminary 
The Reformed Bible Institute was formed in June 2000 and offers the degree of Bachelor of Theology.

External links 
 Official website:Evangelical Reformed Church in Myanmar
 Partner: APWM (the Australian Presbyterian World Mission), the Missions arm of the Presbyterian Church of Australia

References 

Presbyterian denominations in Asia
Christian organizations established in 1992
Presbyterian denominations established in the 20th century
Reformed denominations in Asia
Churches in Myanmar
Members of the World Reformed Fellowship
1992 establishments in Myanmar
Evangelical denominations in Asia